Romance in the Rain is a 1934 American comedy film directed by Stuart Walker and written by Barry Trivers and Gladys Buchanan Unger. The film stars Roger Pryor, Heather Angel, Esther Ralston, Victor Moore, Ruth Donnelly and Henry Armetta. The film was released on August 13, 1934, by Universal Pictures.

Plot
Charlie Denton, a writer, conceives a national Cinderella contest to increase readership for the magazine he works for. Cynthia, winner of the Cinderella contest, tells Charlie there must be a Prince Charming for a Cinderella. A Prince Charming contest is launched to find a match for Cynthia. The winner is slated to marry Cynthia in a highly publicized ceremony. The wedding never occurs, for Charlie proposes to Cynthia and she accepts his proposal.

Cast 
Roger Pryor as Charlie Denton
Heather Angel as Cynthia Brown
Esther Ralston as Gwen de la Rue
Victor Moore as J. Franklyn Blank
Ruth Donnelly as Miss Sparks
Henry Armetta as Tulio
Paul Kaye as Rex Bruce
Christian Rub as Slotnick
Frank Parker as Master of Ceremonies
Georgia Caine as Mrs. Brown
Yellow Horse as The Eskimo 
Betty Francisco as Julia
Lita Chevret as Jennie
Gay Seabrook as Gloria
Clara Kimball Young as Mlle. Fleurette Malevinsky
King Baggot as Milton McGillicuddy
John T. Murray as Melville O'Grunion
Francesca Rotoli as Fanny Pilkington
Grace Hayle as Mrs. Crandall
Guinn "Big Boy" Williams as Panya Mankiewicz

References

External links 
 

1934 films
American comedy films
1934 comedy films
Universal Pictures films
Films directed by Stuart Walker
American black-and-white films
Films scored by Edward Ward (composer)
1930s English-language films
1930s American films